Esperanza Alcantara Icasas-Cabral is a Filipino cardiologist and clinical pharmacologist. She served as Secretary of the Department of Health in the Philippines, taking office in January 2010 to replace Dr. Francisco Duque III after his appointment as chairperson of the Civil Service Commission. Before her appointment as Secretary of Health she was previously the Secretary of the Department of Social Welfare and Development, replacing Corazon Soliman. Dr. Cabral is married to Bienvenido Villegas Cabral, an ophthalmologist.

Education
Cabral graduated from medical school at the University of the Philippines Manila. She extended her medical and pharmacological training at the U.P. Philippine General Hospital, Harvard Medical School, Massachusetts General Hospital, and the Joslin Clinic in Boston, Massachusetts.

Career
Cabral has long served as an educator and leader in Philippine medicine. At the University of the Philippines College of Medicine, she was a professor of medicine and pharmacology. She served both as Director of the Philippine Heart Center and Chief of Cardiology of Asian Hospital and Medical Center. She authored and co-authored more than 85 scientific papers on hypertension, cardiovascular pharmacology and clinical and preventive cardiology. She educated the public as a TV show host on "HeartWatch" on IBC Channel 13 and "InfoMedico" on NBN Channel 4.

She served during the administration of President Corazon Aquino as Director of the Philippine Heart Center. She also consulted for the Dangerous Drugs Board (DDB), the Bureau of Food and Drugs (BFAD) and the Department of Health. Earlier she served as Commissioner for Science and Health on the National Commission on the Role of Filipino Women.

She has earned a number of awards.

One of her contributions as Secretary of Health was the DOH-FDA Administrative Order 2010-0008 (issued on March 18, 2010), which mandated all companies to include in all advertisements, promotional, and/or sponsorship activities or materials concerning food/dietary supplements the following phrase:

MAHALAGANG PAALALA: ANG (NAME OF PRODUCT) AY HINDI GAMOT AT HINDI DAPAT GAMITING PANGGAMOT SA ANUMANG URI NG SAKIT [Important reminder: (Name of product) is not a medicinal drug and should not be used to treat the symptoms of any disease.]

Fearing that the new directive may impact food/dietary supplement companies in a negative way, the Chamber of Herbal Industries of the Philippines (composed of over 65 firms in the country engaged in the manufacture, research and distribution of these products) filed a petition for injunction against it at the Manila Regional Trial Court Branch No. 30 in May 2010. Presiding judge Lilia Purugganan granted it, however, it was lifted on November 28, 2014, after the DOH (which was then led by Enrique Ona) won its appeal at the Court of Appeals Special Fourth Division.

In January 2010, the National Bureau of Investigation filed a libel complaint on behalf of Secretary Cabral after a blog post under the pseudonym "Ella Rose delos Santos" alleged "...that she [Sec. Cabral] and the DSWD employees are corrupt, having diverted donated goods for personal gain at the expense of the typhoon victims and [are] downright incompetent."

Awards and honours

 In 1981, she received the National Outstanding Young Scientist for Medicine Award  from the Department of Science and Technology. 
 In 1982, the Philippine Society of Experimental & Clinical Pharmacology's Achievement Award.
 In 1986, she was named the Outstanding Woman in the Nation's Service for Medicine. 
 In 1991, she received the first Dr. Jose P. Rizal Award by the Philippine Medical Association. 
 1993, Most Distinguished Scientist by the Philippine Heart Association
 1993, Outstanding Alumnus for Research by the UP College of Medicine
 1998, Distinguished Researcher by the Philippine College of Physicians.

References

External links
 https://web.archive.org/web/20070111004129/http://www.op.gov.ph/profiles_cabral.asp
 https://web.archive.org/web/20061114024450/http://www.malaya.com.ph/aug20/livi1.htm
 http://www.medobserver.com/octdec2004/orgmed.html
 http://www.dswd.gov.ph/index.php
 https://web.archive.org/web/20100124051013/http://newsinfo.inquirer.net/inquirerheadlines/metro/view/20100121-248693/Blogger-faces-libel-charge-for-item-on-relief-goods
 https://ww2.fda.gov.ph/attachments/article/224766/FDA%20Memorandum%20Circular%20No.%202015-003.pdf

Filipino cardiologists
Filipino women medical doctors
Year of birth missing (living people)
Living people
Secretaries of Health of the Philippines
Secretaries of Social Welfare and Development of the Philippines
Women members of the Cabinet of the Philippines
Arroyo administration cabinet members
University of the Philippines Manila alumni
20th-century Filipino medical doctors
21st-century Filipino medical doctors
20th-century American women physicians
20th-century American physicians
21st-century American women physicians
21st-century American physicians